Alan Tsagaev (Bulgarian spelling of name: Алан Цагаев) (born 13 September 1977) is a naturalized Bulgarian weightlifter of Ossetian origin who competed in the Men's 105 kg weight class at the 2000 Summer Olympics and won a silver medal, lifting 422.5 kg in total.

Tsagaev tested positive for a steroid in 2008, and therefore Bulgaria's weightlifting federation withdrew its team from the 2008 Summer Olympics. Eight members of the men's team and three women tested positive during out-of-competition tests conducted on 8 and 9 June. Apart from Tsagaev the athletes who tested positive were Ivailo Filev, Demir Demirev, Mehmed Fikretov, Ivan Stoitsov, Ivan Markov, Georgi Markov, Velichko Cholakov, Milka Maneva, Donka Mincheva and Gergana Kirilova.

References 

 After appealing ban, Bulgaria gets weightlifting medal

1977 births
Living people
Bulgarian male weightlifters
Weightlifters at the 2000 Summer Olympics
Olympic weightlifters of Bulgaria
Olympic silver medalists for Bulgaria
Bulgarian sportspeople in doping cases
Doping cases in weightlifting
Place of birth missing (living people)
World record setters in weightlifting
Olympic medalists in weightlifting
Medalists at the 2000 Summer Olympics
Ossetian people
European Weightlifting Championships medalists
World Weightlifting Championships medalists